Haji Zainuddin bin Haji Kassim is a Bruneian former national football player and current coach.

Zainuddin played as a striker for the Bruneian representative team in the Malaysia league in the 80s and 90s. He made several appearances for the national side, and scored a goal in a 1986 World Cup qualifier against Hong Kong.

Zainuddin became a football coach afterwards. After a coaching stint for Brunei's M-League side while still registered as a player in 1988, he took charge of the national team for 6 games at the 2002 World Cup qualifying. He then turned to club football in 2008 with AM Gunners, coaching them until 2011 when the season was aborted abruptly. He was appointed Brunei Under-19 head coach in 2011, followed by being Brunei Under-23 assistant coach in 2013.

In 2020, he was appointed assistant coach of the Brunei national football team headed by Ali Hj Mustafa.

References

External links 

Living people
Bruneian footballers
Brunei international footballers
Bruneian football managers
Brunei national football team managers
1965 births
Brunei (Malaysia Premier League team) players
Association football forwards